is a Japanese manga series written and illustrated by Kōhei Horikoshi. It was serialized in Shueisha's shōnen manga magazine Weekly Shōnen Jump from July 2010 to April 2011, with its chapters collected in five tankōbon volumes. The story follows Hana Aoi, a clumsy teenage girl who works at a zoo to try to improve herself, and also because she loves animals, but she finds out that the zoo has been cursed.

Plot
Hana Aoi, a clumsy teenage girl, is known around her school by the nickname "Clumsy-Good for Nothing". One day, she sees a flyer in town about a zoo that needs workers. After she appears there, she discovers that the zoo is keeping strange things, which she realizes after seeing Shiina, the director of the infamous Oumagadoki Zoo. He has been cursed by a ghost rabbit and given the body of a rabbit. In order to get his original body back, he has to show that he does care for animals by gathering every animal from the world and making his own popular zoo.

Characters

Oumagadoki Zoo

Humans

The lunatic, egotistic director of the Oumagadoki Zoo. He has the body of a rabbit after getting cursed by a ghost rabbit when he was a child. Despite his incredibly childish personality, all the animals of the zoo respect him and he care for them and see each one as his friend, going ballistic when they are endangered. His techniques are Rabbit Peace, Jet Carrot, Rabbit W Peace, Rabbit Serve, Rabbit Slap, White Rabbit of Inaba, Rabbit Plunge Peace, and Rabbit Million Peace.

The clumsy keeper of the Oumagadoki Zoo, taking the job both in order to change herself, and to spend time with animals. She is to be very knowledgeable about the traits and behaviors of various animals, due to her vast love for them.

Animals

She is a snake. When transformed thanks to Shiina's smoke, she bears a resemblance to Medusa. She has a crush on Shiina. Uwabami is also a character in Horikoshi's later work, My Hero Academia.

He is a dhole (red wolf). Although not as powerful as Shiina or Shishido, he is cunning in battle.

He is a lion. His technique is the Lion Heart, as inspired by Shiina's "Rabbit Peace". An extremely violent young lion, he constantly fights Shiina for the position of director of the zoo, but gets defeated easily.

He is a gorilla, as his name states. Even when transformed, his appearance doesn't change. His technique is the Gorilla Claw.

He is a spotted seal. He tends to get kidnapped easily and is a gentleman.

He is a cheetah. He is overweight, but with help from Hana, starts to exercise again.

He is an Indian rhinoceros. He has a one-sided crush on Uwabami.

He is a white-tailed eagle.

He is a hippopotamus.

He is an American bison.

She is a raccoon.

He is a Galapagos tortoise. When transformed, his shell resembles a monster's face. As a tortoise, his weakness is lack of speed.

He is an African elephant.

He is a Nile crocodile.

He is an ostrich.

She is a snowy owl.

He is a western rockhopper penguin.

He is a giraffe.

He is a Japanese giant flying squirrel.

He is a white-handed gibbon.

He is an African porcupine.

He is a Brazilian three-banded armadillo.

He is a blackbuck.

Ushimitsudoki Aquarium

Humans

The director of the Ushimitsudoki Aquarium, an aquarium in the city of Ushimitsu, neighboring Omaga. Shares a curse similar to Shiina and can take the form of a sperm whale. He is feared by the aquarium animals for his ruthless treatment, working them to near death and killing those that refuse to work. He has the ability to generate ultrasound, which can paralyze animals.

Animals

He is an orca and No. 2 of the Ushimitsudoki Aquarium.

He is a walrus and No. 3 of the Ushimitsudoki Aquarium.

He is a Japanese spider crab and No. 4 of the Ushimitsudoki Aquarium.

He is a narwhal and No. 5 of the Ushimitsudoki Aquarium.

He is a great white shark and No. 6 of the Ushimitsudoki Aquarium.

She is a tuna and No. 7 of the Ushimitsudoki Aquarium.

He is a common octopus and No. 8 of the Ushimitsudoki Aquarium.

He is a moray eel.

Yatsudoki Circus

Humans

The director of the Yatsudoki Circus.

The new member of the Yatsudoki Circus.

The animal trainer of the Yatsudoki Circus.

The total ruler of the Yatsudoki Circus. Like Shiina and Isana, he shares a curse and can take the form of a brown bear.

Animals

She is a toy poodle.

He is a white tiger.

He is a thoroughbred.

Other humans

The son of Mukanai.

The sponsor president of the Ushimi Construction Works and the father of Mukio.

Hana's classmate. She always calls her a useless woman and finds it annoying whenever Hana keeps trying.

Ikumi's boyfriend.

One of Hana's classmates and friends.

The gym teacher of the school Hana goes to.

Publication
Oumagadoki Zoo is written and illustrated by Kōhei Horikoshi. The series was serialized in Shueisha's Weekly Shōnen Jump from July 12, 2010 to April 18, 2011. Shueisha collected its chapters into five tankōbon volumes, published from November 4, 2010 to August 4, 2011.

Volume list

References

External links
 Oumagadoki Zoo official website at Weekly Shōnen Jump 
 

2010 manga
Shōnen manga
Shueisha manga
Fiction about zoos